"Minutes to Midnight" is associated with the Doomsday Clock.

Minutes to Midnight may also refer to:

 Minutes to Midnight (Jon English album), 1977
 Minutes to Midnight (Linkin Park album), 2007
 Minutes to Midnight, a work by Robert Ward
 "Minutes to Midnight" (song), a 1984 song by Midnight Oil

See also
 "Doomsday Clock" (song), the opening track from the Smashing Pumpkins album, Zeitgeist
 Doomsday Clock (comics), a superhero comic book limited series
 "2 Minutes to Midnight", a song by Iron Maiden from the 1984 album Powerslave
 "Five Minutes to Midnight", a song by Boys Like Girls from their 2006 self-titled debut album
 "Twenty Years to Midnight", an episode of the animated television series, The Venture Bros
 
 

Date and time disambiguation pages